The 2021 Germany Tri-Nation Series was a Twenty20 International (T20I) cricket tournament that took place in Germany between 5 and 8 August 2021. It was originally due to be played in May 2021, but was postponed due to a new lockdown in Germany caused by the COVID-19 pandemic.

The participating teams were the hosts Germany, along with France and Norway. Spain were also scheduled to participate in a quadrangular event, but withdrew on 28 July due to COVID-19-related travel restrictions. The matches were all played at the Bayer Uerdingen Cricket Ground, part of the German Cricket Federation's National Performance Centre in the city of Krefeld. These were the first official T20I matches to be played in Germany since the International Cricket Council (ICC) granted full T20I status to all competitive matches between its members from 1 January 2019.

Germany won the tournament, beating Norway by six wickets in the final.

Squads

Round-robin

Points table

Fixtures

Final

References

External links
 Series home at ESPNCricinfo

Associate international cricket competitions in 2021
Germany Quadrangular Series, 2021